Portus (which means "harbour" in Latin) may refer to Portus, a harbour of ancient Rome and an archaeological site.

It may also refer to:

People
Franciscus Portus (1511 – 1581), Greek-Italian classical scholar
Portus Baxter (1806 – 1868), American politician
Alexander Portus, 19th-century Australian politician
G. V. Portus (1883–1954), Australian academic
William Portus Cullen (1855 – 1935), Australian chief justice and politician
Leocán Portus (1923 – 2006), Chilean politician

Various Roman ports
Portus, at the mouth of the Tiber, Italy
Portus Adurni, modern Portchester, England
Portus Cale, modern Porto, Portugal
Portus Dubris, modern Dover, England
Itius Portus, perhaps Boulogne or Wissant, France
Portus Julius, near Naples, Italy

See also

Portus Mercatorum, a literal rendering of the Latin name for Copenhagen (a rare alternative to the city's standard Latin name, which is the loanword Hafnia)
Portus Mariae, a literal rendering of the Latin name for Mariehamn
Portus Magnus (disambiguation)

Port (disambiguation)
Portius